The Osaka at-large district is a constituency of the House of Councillors that elects Councillors to represent Osaka Prefecture in the National Diet of Japan. From 1947 the district has elected three Councillors every three years by single non-transferable vote for six-year terms, such that there are six Councillors representing the district in the 242-member house. A revision to the Public Officers Electoral Law in 2012 increased the district's representation so that four Councillors were elected at the July 2013 election which will give the district a total eight Councillors by 2019.

The district has 7,140,578 registered voters (as of September 2015), making it the third-largest district behind the Tokyo and Kanagawa districts. The current Councillors for the district are:

Class of 2010 - Term expires in July 2016
Hirotaka Ishikawa - Komeito party, first-term Councillor
Issei Kitagawa - Liberal Democratic Party (LDP), second term
Motoyuki Odachi - Democratic Party of Japan (DPJ), second term

Class of 2013 - Term expires in July 2019
Toru Azuma - Initiatives from Osaka party, first term
Hisatake Sugi - Komeito, first term
Kotaro Tatsumi - Japan Communist Party, first term
Takuji Yanagimoto - LDP, first term

Elected Councillors 

Notes:

References 

Districts of the House of Councillors (Japan)